The year 1912 was marked, in science fiction, by the following events.

Births and deaths

Births 
 February 17 : Andre Norton, American writer (died 2005)
 February 20 : Pierre Boulle, French writer (died 1994)
 April 8 : John Carnell, British editor (died 1972)
 April 26 : A. E. van Vogt, Canadian writer (died 2000)

Deaths

Events

Awards 
The main science-fiction Awards known at the present time did not exist at this time.

Literary releases

Novels 
 Das Menschenschlachthaus. Bilder vom kommenden Krieg, novel by Wilhelm Lamszus.
 The Scarlet Plague, novel by Jack London.
 The Lost World, novel by Arthur Conan Doyle.

Stories collections

Short stories

Comics

Audiovisual outputs

Movies

See also 
 1912 in science
 1911 in science fiction
 1913 in science fiction

References

science-fiction
Science fiction by year